The 2022 Lisboa Belém Open was a professional tennis tournament played on outdoor clay courts. It was the sixth (men) and second (women) editions of the tournament which were part of the 2022 ATP Challenger Tour and the 2022 ITF Women's World Tennis Tour. It took place in Lisbon, Portugal between 26 September and 2 October 2022.

Men's singles main draw entrants

Seeds

 1 Rankings are as of 19 September 2022.

Other entrants
The following players received wildcards into the singles main draw:
  João Domingues
  Frederico Ferreira Silva
  Pedro Sousa

The following player received entry into the singles main draw as a special exempt:
  Nicolas Moreno de Alboran

The following players received entry into the singles main draw as alternates:
  Timofey Skatov
  Miljan Zekić

The following players received entry from the qualifying draw:
  Duje Ajduković
  Javier Barranco Cosano
  Jeremy Jahn
  Gonçalo Oliveira
  Oriol Roca Batalla
  Luca Van Assche

The following player received entry as a lucky loser:
  Daniel Michalski

Women's singles main draw entrants

Seeds

 1 Rankings are as of 19 September 2022.

Other entrants
The following players received wildcards into the singles main draw:
  Francisca Jorge
  Matilde Jorge
  Sara Lança
  Ana Filipa Santos

The following players received entry from the qualifying draw:
  Enola Chiesa
  Marta González Encinas
  Ksenia Laskutova
  Giorgia Pinto
  Caroline Roméo
  Gaia Squarcialupi
  Sevil Yuldasheva
  Aleksandra Zuchańska

Champions

Men's singles

 Marco Cecchinato def.  Luca Van Assche 6–3, 6–3.

Women's singles
  Carole Monnet def.  Joanne Züger 1–6, 6–3, 6–2

Men's doubles

 Zdeněk Kolář /  Gonçalo Oliveira def.  Vladyslav Manafov /  Oleg Prihodko 6–1, 7–6(7–4).

Women's doubles
 Francisca Jorge /  Matilde Jorge def.  Irene Burillo Escorihuela /  Andrea Lázaro García, 6–2, 6–2

References

External links
 Official website

2022 ATP Challenger Tour
2022 ITF Women's World Tennis Tour
2022
September 2022 sports events in Portugal
October 2022 sports events in Portugal